Here is the part2 of the list of Italian football transfers summer 2009.

Summer transfer window (August)

Summer transfer window (date unknown)

Out of windows transfers

References

External links

Italy
Trans
2009